Caryota obtusa is a species of flowering plant in the palm family from India, Laos and Thailand.  The palm is commonly called giant fishtail palm or Thai giant caryota. It can reach 20 meters or more in height and is thus considered a tree. It is monocarpic meaning it flowers once, then dies. Its inflorescence can reach 6 meters or more in length.

References
 World Checklist of Monocotyledons, Caryota obtusa Griff., Calcutta J. Nat. Hist. 5: 480 (1845). Accessed 30 April 2008.
 International Plant Names Index, Arecaceae Caryota obtusa Griff. Accessed 30 April 2008.
 Palm and Cycad Societies of Australia, Caryota - The Big Ones. Accessed 30 April 2008.
 Multilingual Multiscript Plant Name Database, Sorting Caryota Names. Accessed 30 April 2008.

obtusa
Flora of East Himalaya
Flora of Assam (region)
Trees of Laos
Trees of Thailand